The Critics' Choice Super Awards is an awards show presented annually by the Critics Choice Association to honor the finest in genre fiction film, television and home media releases, including action, superhero, horror, science fiction, fantasy and animation releases. They were first established in 2020, with the inaugural ceremony taking place on January 10, 2021, virtually, due to the COVID-19 pandemic.

History
The awards were first announced on October 12, 2020 by the Critics Choice Association. According to the acting CEO of the Critics Choice Association, Joey Berlin, the Critics' Choice Super Awards were created to "recognize the brilliance, creativity, and artistic excellence showcased in genres that, for far too long, have been overlooked by other award shows." The inaugural ceremony aired on the CW on January 10, 2021 and was produced by Bob Bain Productions.

Categories

Film

Television

Retired awards

Notes

Ceremonies

See also
 Critics' Choice Movie Awards
 Critics' Choice Television Awards
 Saturn Awards

References

2020 establishments in the United States
American animation awards
Awards established in 2020
Broadcast Film Critics Association Awards
American television awards
Fantasy awards
Horror fiction awards
Science fiction awards
Voice acting awards